The 1896 United States presidential election in Vermont took place on November 3, 1896 as part of the 1896 United States presidential election. Voters chose four representatives, or electors to the Electoral College, who voted for president and vice president.

Vermont overwhelmingly voted for the Republican nominee, former Governor of Ohio William McKinley, over the Democratic nominee, former U.S. Representative from Nebraska William Jennings Bryan. With 80.08% of the popular vote, Vermont would be McKinley's strongest victory in the 1896 presidential election in terms of percentage in the popular vote, and remains the best performance of any presidential candidate in the Green Mountain State to date. McKinley won Vermont by a landslide margin of 63.42%, which is the second-best performance by the Republican Party in a state in any presidential election behind only Barry Goldwater in Mississippi in 1964 – ironically the first election when the Green Mountain State deserted the GOP.

Bryan, running on a platform of free silver, appealed strongly to Western miners and farmers in the 1896 election, but had practically no appeal in the Northeastern state of Vermont. In fact, with only 16.66% of the popular vote Bryan's performance in Vermont was the second weakest of any Democratic presidential candidate to date only after John W. Davis' 15.67% in 1924.

Results

Results by county

See also
 United States presidential elections in Vermont

References

Vermont
1896
1896 Vermont elections